The 2018 AFF Beach Soccer Championship is the second edition of the AFF Beach Soccer Championship, the premier regional beach soccer championship exclusively contested by Southeast Asian men's national teams who are members of the ASEAN Football Federation (AFF). 

Organised by the AFF, the tournament takes place between 18–24 November in Tanjung Benoa, Bali, Indonesia, featuring five teams.

Malaysia are the defending champions.

Teams
 (hosts)

Group stage

Placement stage

Third place match

Final

References

External links
AFF BEACH SOCCER CHAMPIONSHIP, at aseanfootball.org
Jadual Perlawanan Kejohanan Bola Sepak Pantai AFF 2018 

AFF Beach Soccer Championship
2018 in beach soccer
AFF Beach Soccer Championship
International association football competitions hosted by Indonesia